Vandanam is a 1989 Indian Malayalam-language romantic comedy film directed by Priyadarshan, written by V. R. Gopalakrishnan, and produced by P. K. R. Pillai. The film stars Mohanlal and Girija Shettar, while Mukesh and Nedumudi Venu appear in supporting roles. The songs were composed by Ouseppachan, while the background score was by Johnson.

Priyadarshan remade the film in Telugu as Nirnayam (1991) with Sukumari reprising her role. The film is based on the 1987 American film Stakeout. A comedy sequence from this movie was reported to be re-used by Priyadarshan in the 2021 Hindi film Hungama 2.

Plot 
Professor Kurian Fernandez, a convict, escapes from jail along with Raghu, his cellmate. After a failed attempt to chase and nab the duo, the officials draw up several plans to capture both. Police authorities strongly feel that Fernandez will land up in Bangalore and may try to meet up with his only daughter. Unnikrishnan and K. Purushothaman Nair, two inspectors from Kerala Police, are sent to Bangalore to follow the activities of Gaadha, daughter of Fernandez.

Upon reaching Bangalore, Unnikrishnan meets Peter, his college mate, who is also now an inspector with Karnataka Police. Unnikrishnan and Peter make up a team and sideline Purushothaman Nair, who struggles hard to cope up with Kannada language. The police team stays at a room just opposite to where Gaadha stays as a paying guest. Gaadha, working at an advertisement agency as a copy writer is staying along with aunt Maggie, who is constantly in a fight with her son. Unnikrishnan and Peter, who are born flirts, are more interested in drinking and playing cards than investigating. K. P. Nair tries to report this to the authorities, but fails in getting both in control. Unnikrishnan slowly develops a crush towards Gaadha, which gets transformed into a full-fledged passion, but Gaadha never accepts it. Unni befriends Maggie aunty and tries all ways to woo Gaadha.

Meanwhile, Unni and Peter finds out that Fernandez is in the city and is constantly in touch with Gaadha. The police commissioner is in all efforts to nab Fernandez. Unnikrishnan decides to use Gaadha to reach out to Fernandez. Gaadha reveals to Unni about the past of Fernandez, when he was a college professor, who was loved and cared for by the students. The sincere professor questioned the college authorities on many administration malpractices, which made him a dust in their eyes. The sons of the local M.P, who was corrupt and the police commissioner were punished by the professor, which led to a serious fracas in college and authorities were forced to take action on them under severe protests from students. In retaliation, they and their friends attacked professor Fernandez while he was travelling with a female student after a college event in the night. The girl was raped and later committed suicide and the professor was falsely convicted in the case.

Now, the professor is out of jail to avenge on it. Unnikrishnan tries to convince the professor with the help of Gaadha, but he fails to give up. Meanwhile, an elderly and wealthy businessman, who is a client of the ad agency, where Gaadha works, likes her and asks her to join him as his secretary abroad. Gaadha, who had by then developed a soft feeling towards Unni, lets him bring his mother to see her to fix their marriage. At the same time, the professor succeeds in killing the sons of the commissioner and the M.P, as well as their dishonest lawyer, who had fabricated the professor in the rape case. The Commissioner orders "shoot at sight" at Fernandez.

The professor contracts a mental illness and decides to plant a bomb at the city stadium, which might kill hundreds of civilians. Raghu parts ways with the professor as a result of the latter's deteriorating mental equilibrium, but is shot dead by him when he decides to foil his plan of bombing the stadium by revealing it to the police. Unnikrishnan asks Gaadha to make her father give up this heinous plan, but he refuses. That evening, Fernandez plants the bombs in the stadium, but the police team under Unnikrishnan corners him and takes him to the tower. The professor, despite repeated requests, refuses to explain how to defuse the bomb. But Unnikrishnan successfully defuses the bomb, thereby saving the lives of hundreds.

In the stampede and chaos that had ensued in the stadium amongst the spectators of the football match after the news of the bombs had been leaked, a revengeful Fernandez stabs the M.P to death, and is finally captured back by the police. Unnikrishnan safely and successfully rescues Gaadha from the police, who had captured her on the orders of the commissioner who wanted to take revenge from Fernandez for killing the former's son. To save her from the future actions of the commissioner, Unni and Gaadha decide to leave for Kerala together to get married. But due to their ill-fate, Gaadha, who actually wanted to join with Unni, could not join with him and decides to go with the old man to London. The film ends with both the cars with Gaadha and Unni, both lovers being unaware of each other's presence, stopping at a junction and when the signal turns green, they move to opposite roads.

Cast

Production 
Girija Shettar was chosen for the role after Priyadarshan watched her in Geethanjali. This was her only Malayalam film released, as her second film Dhanushkodi, directed by Priyadarshan, starring Mohanlal and Raghuvaran was shelved.

Soundtrack 
The songs of this film were composed by Ouseppachan, with lyrics penned by Shibu Chakravarthy except "Thillana" which is a composition of M. Balamuralikrishna.

Reception 
Vandanam was an average grosser at the box office. Despite this, it was remade in Telugu as Nirnayam by Priyadarshan himself. However, the film went on to achieve cult status in the years following its release. Is a gripping revenge thriller film and usual Priyadarshan comedy and Mohanlal Mukesh combo become biggest popularity 
.

References

External links 
 

1980s Malayalam-language films
1989 films
Films about miscarriage of justice
Films shot in Bangalore
Fictional portrayals of the Karnataka Police
Films directed by Priyadarshan
Indian remakes of American films
Films scored by Ouseppachan
Malayalam films remade in other languages